Achim Stocker (27 May 1935 – 1 November 2009) was the president of German football club SC Freiburg.

Biography
He worked 37 years as the chairman of SC Freiburg since 1972 and was the oldest and longest serving president in professional German football.

Death
Stocker died on 1 November 2009 of a heart attack.

Personal life
He was Cabinet director in Pension (Head director of finances) and leaves behind his wife Hanne with his son Christian and daughter Sabine.

References 

1935 births
2009 deaths
SC Freiburg
German football chairmen and investors